Alejandro Darío Gómez (born 15 February 1988), known as Papu Gómez, is an Argentine professional footballer who plays as a forward, winger or attacking midfielder for Spanish club Sevilla and the Argentina national team.

Gómez started his club career in his home country with Arsenal de Sarandí in 2005, before joining San Lorenzo in 2009. The following year, he was signed by Italian club Catania. In 2013, he joined Ukrainian side Metalist Kharkiv, where he remained for a single season, before returning to Italy to play for Atalanta. In 2019–20, Gómez set the Serie A record for most assists in a single season with sixteen, and was named to the Serie A Team of the Year.

Although he was born in Argentina, Gómez is a dual citizen of Argentina and Italy, having gained Italian citizenship on 14 May 2016, as his wife is an Italian citizen. He made his senior international debut for Argentina in a friendly against Singapore in 2017, during which he also scored his first international goal. He later took part in Argentina's victorious 2021 Copa América and 2022 FIFA World Cup campaigns.

Club career

Arsenal de Sarandí
Gómez began his career playing with the youth squad of Argentine side Arsenal de Sarandí, debuting for the team in 2003. Two years later, he was officially called up to the first team, but did not feature as a regular with the side until the 2006 Torneo Apertura, during which he scored 2 goals in 15 appearances, as Arsenal finished the season in 5th place.

On 30 November 2007, Gómez scored the 2 most important goals up to that point of his career in the first leg of the Copa Sudamericana Finals, away against favourites Club América of Liga MX, giving Arsenal a valuable 3–2 lead going into the second leg. On 5 December, Arsenal lost the return leg 2–1, but won their first international title on the away goals rule.

The 2008–09 season was his breakout season, as he scored 8 goals in 18 appearances and got into the top scoring charts with braces against Independiente and Velez Sarsfield.

San Lorenzo
San Lorenzo de Almagro signed Gómez for a 2 million dollar transfer fee, half of his estimated market value, in time for the 2009 Clausura tournament. His impressive play, including netting 8 times in 48 appearances for Los Santos, attracted the attention of several high-profile scouts. This led to his transfer to Italian Serie A Catania in July 2010, for €3 million.

Catania
Catania officially welcomed their new 22-year-old signing on 21 July 2010, and he made his first appearance with the club 9 days later in a 1–0 friendly win against Greek side Iraklis. Gómez was immediately inserted into the starting XI and soon became integral to his club's record-breaking renaissance over the next 3 seasons.

El Papu contributed 4 goals and 5 assists in each of his first 2 seasons. His breakthrough campaign came during the 2012–13 season, when his playmaking and offensive prowess became the main catalyst of the team, propelling his side to club record highs for home and overall victories, and, for their 5th successive year, points. The Rossazzurri clinched an eighth-place finish in Serie A, equaling their historic best placement in the league for the first time since the 1964–65 season, but 5 points shy of earning their inaugural appearance in the UEFA Europa League. The side that managed to achieve these record-breaking achievements was described as the best Catania side in the club's history. Gómez finished the year with a career high 8 goals in 36 appearances, making him the second highest on the team behind Gonzalo Bergessio, as well as 7 assists, making him the club's joint highest assist provider, and the tenth best provider in Serie A.

Catania, for reasons that were never clarified, sold Gómez during the summer and replaced him with the injury-prone and inconsistent Sebastián Leto, whom they acquired on a free transfer from Panathinaikos. Despite having four of their top six offensive players return, and later five of their six when Francesco Lodi was reacquired on loan from Genoa in January, Catania's performances declined heavily, which saw them fall to 18th position in the league, and as a result, they were ultimately relegated.

Metalist Kharkiv

Rebuffing offers from several big clubs, including Atletico Madrid, Fiorentina, and Inter Milan, Gómez himself requested a transfer to little-known Metalist Kharkiv of the Ukrainian Premier League, citing the Club's commitment to growth and the opportunity to play in the upcoming UEFA Champions League as his reasons. On 2 August 2013, he signed four-year contract with the club, which included a €12 million release clause, following a €7 million transfer fee. However, things did not go well for him with the side from the beginning.

UEFA upheld Metalist's ban from the Champions League two weeks later because of the club's involvement in match fixing in 2008. By the December winter break, failing to settle into his new surroundings due to a combination of the league's lack of visibility and quality, which he believed made playing in it a waste of time, as well as adverse environmental and linguistic issues in Ukraine itself, which he saw as insurmountable, Gómez wanted out of his contract. He therefore requested a transfer back to Serie A as soon as possible, preferably to Fiorentina, and by January 2014, offered to accept a salary reduction in order to have this accomplished. This request went unfilled, however, and he ultimately played in 23 games, scoring 3 goals and setting up 4 others, helping the Hor'ky finish 3rd overall.

Gómez refused to return to Ukraine the following season because of the volatile and violent political climate that emerged during his time there. He stated "It's an anguished situation, very unstable, as we are all sad and living in a state of panic...I have no intention of coming back...I will stay in Buenos Aires...Until there can be guarantees of safety, I cannot expose my family to these dangers." Many players, especially foreign ones, also left the league for this same reason, including three of Gomez's teammates, and six from reigning league Champions Shakhtar Donetsk. As a result, the Ukrainian League saw its foreign player total reduced from 170 to 60 over the next two years.

Atalanta

Following Giacomo Bonaventura's departure to Milan on 1 September 2014, Atalanta acquired Gómez on the same day, signing him on a three-year deal in the last hours of the summer transfer window in Italy. Gómez had a decent first season, contributing 3 goals and 2 assists in 24 appearances to a poor, offensively-challenged Nerazzurri squad that struggled and narrowly avoided relegation, finishing fourth from the bottom, 3 points ahead of Serie B-bound Cagliari.

The following season, Gómez lead his club in both goals and assists, with 7 and 6 respectively, as he rekindled the form he had shown in his final season at Catania, and, despite the continued lack of attacking support, steered Atalanta to a respectable 13th-place finish in the league. His performances spurred the interest of several big clubs, which pushed the Bergamese side to extend his contract until June 2020, on 4 February 2016.

During the 2016–17 season, Gómez managed to score an unprecedented total of 16 goals as his team finished in the fourth place contrary to the lower pre-season expectations. In 2017, following the departure and retirement of Cristian Raimondi, he became the team's captain.

As captain, Gómez helped lead Atalanta to a historic third-place finish in the 2018–19 Serie A season, earning a spot in the 2019–20 UEFA Champions League, as well as reaching the 2019 Coppa Italia Final.

Gómez scored his first Champions League goal on 26 November 2019 with a brilliant piece of individual ability in a 2–0 home win against Dinamo Zagreb. During the 2019–20 season, Gómez set the Serie A record for most assists in a single season with 16 assists.

During half time of Atalanta's Champions League group stage match against FC Midtjylland on 1 December 2020, there was a heated exchange between Gómez and manager Gian Piero Gasperini over his positioning on the pitch. Gómez did not re-enter the pitch at the start of the second half. After starting in Atalanta's final group stage match against Ajax, the relationship between Gómez and Gasperini completely broke down. Despite amending his relationship with the president, Gómez stated that his relationship with Gasperini could not be fixed; he made his last appearance for the club in a Serie A match against Juventus on 16 December. Gómez requested a transfer in the January transfer window, to which Atalanta agreed, stating however that they would not sell him to a Serie A rival.

Sevilla
On 26 January 2021, La Liga club Sevilla announced the signing of Gómez on a deal running until June 2024. He made his debut for the club on 2 February, playing 60 minutes of Sevilla's 1–0 victory against Almería in the Copa del Rey. Four days later, he scored his first Sevilla goal in a 3–0 win over Getafe.

International career

In 2007 Gómez was picked to represent the Argentina Under-20 team at the 2007 South American Youth Championship in Paraguay. Later that year he was part of the Argentina squad that won the 2007 FIFA U-20 World Cup in Canada.

Having only played internationally for Argentina at youth level, dual citizenship was widely believed to have qualified him for selection to the senior Italian national team, for whom he had expressed interest in playing. FIFA has since ruled him ineligible to switch his football nationality, however, because he did not have a dual passport when he first represented Argentina at that level, and does not have Italian lineage, which would have allowed him to override this requirement.

On 19 May 2017, Gómez received his first senior call-up by newly appointed coach Jorge Sampaoli for Argentina's friendlies against Brazil and Singapore in June. He made his senior international debut in the match against Singapore on 13 June, helping Argentina to a 6–0 away win, and also marked his debut by scoring his first international goal, while also setting up a goal for Federico Fazio during the same match. He went to make three more international appearances that year.

In June 2021, Gómez was included in Argentina's squad for the 2021 Copa América in Brazil. On 21 June, he scored the only goal of the match in Argentina's third group match against Paraguay; the result allowed his side to progress to the quarter-finals. A week later, he scored again in a 4–1 win against Bolivia in his team's final group stage match, also helping to win a penalty, which was converted by Lionel Messi.
He was included in Argentina's final 26-man squad for the 2022 FIFA World Cup, starting his nations's opening game as they went all the way to win a third world title after defeating France on penalties in the final.

Style of play
A talented, diminutive player, with quick feet, explosive acceleration, and a low centre of gravity, Gómez is a creative, technically gifted, and dynamic footballer, who is renowned for his pace, dribbling skills, and high work-rate.

Possessing good movement and a powerful and accurate long range shot with either foot, he is known for his eye for goal from midfield, although he is also capable of creating goalscoring opportunities for teammates. A versatile attacker, he is capable of playing in several offensive positions, and has even been deployed as a main striker on occasion, or as a false 9, although he usually plays as a second striker, in a central playmaking role as an attacking midfielder, or as a winger, usually on the left flank, a position which enables him to take on defenders in one on one situations, cut into the centre onto his stronger right foot, and attempt a curling shot at goal, although he was often used on the right wing earlier in his career. Due to his stamina and work-ethic, he has also been deployed in a box-to-box role on occasion. In recent seasons, he has often operated in a free attacking role in the centre, behind another striker, which enables him to link-up with his teammates, roam the pitch at will, change positions with other forwards, lose his markers by dropping off onto the flanks, or find space in the box with his runs and finish off chances; Gómez has described this role as a "false second striker". He is also an accurate free kick taker, and often takes penalties for his team. In addition to his playing ability, Gómez is also known for his leadership qualities, having served as Atalanta's captain.

Career statistics

Club

International

Scores and results list Argentina's goal tally first, score column indicates score after each Gómez goal.

Personal life
Gómez's uncle is former Club Atlético Independiente defender Hugo Villaverde, who is his mother's brother. Gómez is married to Linda Raff, with whom he has three children. 

Gómez is a dual citizen of Argentina and Italy due to his wife being an Italian citizen.

Honours
Arsenal de Sarandí
Copa Sudamericana: 2007
Suruga Bank Championship: 2008

Argentina U20
FIFA U-20 World Cup: 2007

Argentina
FIFA World Cup: 2022
Copa América: 2021 
CONMEBOL–UEFA Cup of Champions: 2022

Individual
Serie A top assist provider: 2018–19, 2019–20
Serie A Player of the Month: June 2020, September 2020
Serie A Best Midfielder: 2019–20
UEFA Champions League Squad of the Season: 2019–20
 Serie A Team of the Year: 2019–20

Notes

References

External links

 Profile at the Sevilla FC website
 Video: Alejandro Papu Gomez's goals in Arsenal Futbol Club Of Sarandi (Argentina)
 Alejandro Darío Gómez – Argentine Primera statistics at Fútbol XXI 
 Alejandro Gómez at Football Lineups

1988 births
Living people
Footballers from Buenos Aires
Argentine footballers
Association football midfielders
Arsenal de Sarandí footballers
San Lorenzo de Almagro footballers
Catania S.S.D. players
FC Metalist Kharkiv players
Atalanta B.C. players
Sevilla FC players
Argentine Primera División players
Serie A players
Ukrainian Premier League players
La Liga players
Argentina under-20 international footballers
Argentina international footballers
Argentine expatriate footballers
Argentine expatriate sportspeople in Italy
Argentine expatriate sportspeople in Spain
Argentine expatriate sportspeople in Ukraine
Expatriate footballers in Italy
Expatriate footballers in Spain
Expatriate footballers in Ukraine
Naturalised citizens of Italy
2021 Copa América players
2022 FIFA World Cup players
Copa América-winning players
FIFA World Cup-winning players